The Lorine Niedecker Cottage is located in Blackhawk Island, Wisconsin.

History
Lorine Niedecker was a noted poet and a native of Blackhawk Island. She resided in this cottage with her husband and wrote a number of her works in it. It was added to the State Register of Historic Places in 2017 and to the National Register of Historic Places in 2018.

References

Houses on the National Register of Historic Places in Wisconsin
Log buildings and structures on the National Register of Historic Places in Wisconsin
National Register of Historic Places in Jefferson County, Wisconsin
Houses in Jefferson County, Wisconsin
Houses completed in 1946